Morten Christensen (born 15 June 1965) is a former tennis player from Denmark.

Christensen represented his native country at the 1988 Summer Olympics in Seoul, South Korea. There he was defeated in the first round by the number fifteen seed from Yugoslavia, Slobodan Živojinović. The right-hander reached his highest singles ATP-ranking on 18 April 1988, when he rose to the rank of World No. 250.

See also
List of Denmark Davis Cup team representatives

References

External links
 
 
 

1965 births
Living people
Danish male tennis players
Olympic tennis players of Denmark
Sportspeople from Copenhagen
Tennis players at the 1988 Summer Olympics
20th-century Danish people